Walter A. Kinsella (September 5, 1885 – January 31, 1971) was a squash and real tennis player from the beginning of the 20th century. He was a world squash champion from 1914 to 1926 In real tennis, Kinsella lost three challenges for the world championship, to Fred Covey in 1922 and 1923, and to the great Pierre Etchebaster in 1930 at Prince's Club.

References

External links
Photo at the NYPL digital gallery

1885 births
1971 deaths
American male squash players
American real tennis players
Place of birth missing